Helen G. Pratt is a United States Marine Corps major general who has served as the Director of Reserve Affairs of the United States Marine Corps since August 2019. Previously, she served as the Commanding General of the 4th Marine Logistics Group from August 13, 2016 to July 14, 2018.

References

External links

Year of birth missing (living people)
Living people
Place of birth missing (living people)
Satellite High School alumni
Female generals of the United States Marine Corps